Blanca Tejos Muñoz is a Chilean journalist, writer, and teacher, best known for winning the Lenka Franulic Award in 1964 and the Helena Rubinstein Award in 1967.

Career
Blanca Tejos Muñoz's journalistic career started at the newspaper El Mercurio in 1941 as the third woman journalist to work for the publication in its history. She continued to work for the paper until 1980.

In the field of narrative, in 1997 she published Miscelánea cuentos y crónicas under the pseudonym White.

She married Jesús Aurtenechea Léniz, who died on 11 March 2010.

References

20th-century Chilean women writers
20th-century Chilean non-fiction writers
21st-century Chilean women writers
21st-century Chilean non-fiction writers
Chilean journalists
Chilean women journalists
Living people
Year of birth missing (living people)